Guy Reibel (born 27 October 1936 in Strasbourg, France) is a French contemporary classical music composer.

Reibel made his musical studies at the Conservatoire de Paris and trained under Olivier Messiaen. He is a pioneer of the Groupe de Recherches Musicales with Pierre Schaeffer, François Bayle, Luc Ferrari, François-Bernard Mâche, Iannis Xenakis, Bernard Parmegiani, Marcelle Deschênes. He has also collaborated with French public broadcasting stations like France Musique and France Culture. He is cited as the conceptualizer of the digital musical instrument  (1985).

Discography

 1967 Solfège de l'objet sonore with Pierre Schaeffer
 1969 À mille et une voix
 1983 Langages imaginaires
 1983 Suite pour Edgar Poe
 1994 Granulations–sillages...
 2000 Chœurs imaginaires
 2006 Le Jeu vocal

List of works
Chants sauvages pour piano et Omni

External links

Profile, Last.fm

21st-century classical composers
20th-century classical composers
French classical composers
French male classical composers
Living people
1936 births
Electroacoustic music composers
20th-century French composers
21st-century French composers
20th-century French male musicians
21st-century French male musicians